{{DISPLAYTITLE:C16H17NO3}}
The molecular formula C16H17NO3 (molar mass: 271.31 g/mol, exact mass: 271.1208 u) may refer to:

 A-68930
 Higenamine, or norcoclaurine
 Normorphine

Molecular formulas